Cihad Erginay (born 24 September 1966) is a Turkish diplomat and current ambassador of Turkey to Afghanistan.

Education and career 
Erginay graduated from Middle East Technical University with a bachelor's degree in International Relations. He joined the Turkish Ministry of Foreign Affairs in 1988 and served as the Turkish ambassador to Czech Republic, Bosnia and Herzegovina, Spain and Afghanistan at different times of his career.

References 

21st-century Turkish diplomats
1966 births
Living people
Ambassadors of Turkey to Afghanistan
Ambassadors of Turkey to the Czech Republic
Ambassadors of Turkey to Spain
Ambassadors of Turkey to Bosnia and Herzegovina